The 2014 Southern Utah Thunderbirds softball team represented Southern Utah University in the 2014 NCAA Division I softball season.  Kyle Magnusson entered his fifth season as head coach of the Thunderbirds. The Thunderbirds were picked to finish third in the 2014 Big Sky standings. The Thunderbirds finished third in the conference to qualify for the Big Sky Tournament, where they went 3-1 to win the Big Sky Championship and the automatic bid to the NCAA Tournament. The Thunderbirds claimed the title of the 62-seed and opened competition in the Los Angeles region against top seed UCLA. After going 0-2 in the Los Angeles Regional, the Thunderbirds finished the season 23-31.

2014 Roster

Schedule 

|-
!colspan=10 style="background:#FF0000; color:#FFFFFF;"| Red Desert Classic

 

|-
!colspan=10 style="background:#FF0000; color:#FFFFFF;"| Fresno State Kick-Off

|-
!colspan=10 style="background:#FF0000; color:#FFFFFF;"| GCU Invitational

|-
!colspan=10 style="background:#FF0000; color:#FFFFFF;"| Colorado State Classic

|-
!colspan=10 style="background:#FF0000; color:#FFFFFF;"| Springhill Suites Invitational II

|-
!colspan=10 style="background:#FF0000; color:#FFFFFF;"| Regular Season

|-
!colspan=10 style="background:#FF0000;"| 2014 Big Sky Tournament

|-
!colspan=10 style="background:#FF0000;"| 2014 NCAA Regionals

References 

Southern Utah
Southern Utah Thunderbirds softball seasons
Southern Utah softball